The Pink Triangle Park is a triangle-shaped mini-park located in the Castro District of San Francisco, California. The park sits directly above the Castro Street Station of Muni Metro, across from Harvey Milk Plaza. It is the first permanent, free-standing memorial in America dedicated to the thousands of persecuted homosexuals in Nazi Germany during the Holocaust of World War II.

Fifteen triangular granite "pylons", or columns, are dedicated to the thousands of homosexual, bisexual, and transgender victims that were killed during Hitler's Nazi regime. In the center of the park is a loose rock-filled triangle that includes rose crystals. Visitors are encouraged to take a crystal as part of the memorial experience. The triangle theme recalls the Nazis forcing homosexual men to wear pink triangles sewn to their clothes as an identifier and badge of shame. The Pink Triangle Park was dedicated on the United Nations Human Rights Day, December 10, 2001, by the Eureka Valley Promotion Association. According to the non-profit that maintains the space, the Pink Triangle Park serves as "a physical reminder of how the persecution of any individual or single group of people damages all humanity." The Castro serves as an LGBT neighborhood for the San Francisco and Bay Areas communities, as well as a tourist destination for its part in modern LGBT history.

See also

 List of Holocaust memorials and museums in the United States
 List of LGBT monuments and memorials

References 
Notes

Sources

External links 

 

2003 establishments in California
2003 in LGBT history
2003 sculptures
Castro District, San Francisco
Granite sculptures in California
Holocaust commemoration
Monuments and memorials to the victims of Nazism
LGBT culture in San Francisco
LGBT monuments and memorials in the United States
Monuments and memorials in California
Outdoor sculptures in San Francisco
Parks in San Francisco
Persecution of homosexuals in Nazi Germany
Protected areas established in 2003
Stone sculptures in California